Edmund Prosper Clowney (July 30, 1917 – March 20, 2005) was a theologian, educator, and pastor.

Early life and education
Born in Philadelphia, Pennsylvania, he earned a Bachelor of Arts from Wheaton College in 1939, a Bachelor of Theology from Westminster Theological Seminary in 1942, a Master of Sacred Theology from Yale Divinity School in 1944, and a Doctor of Divinity from Wheaton College in 1966.

Ministry
Clowney was ordained in the Orthodox Presbyterian Church, and served as pastor for churches in Connecticut, Illinois, and New Jersey from 1942 to 1946. Westminster Theological Seminary invited him to become an assistant professor of practical theology in 1952. In 1966 he became the first president of that seminary, and remained so until 1984, when he became the theologian-in-residence of Trinity Presbyterian Church (part of the Presbyterian Church in America) in Charlottesville, Virginia. In 1990, he moved to Escondido, California where he was adjunct professor at Westminster Seminary California. In 2001 he began a full-time position as associate pastor at Christ the King Presbyterian Church in Houston, Texas. After two years in Texas, Clowney returned to Trinity Presbyterian Church as part-time theologian-in-residence, a position he held until his death in 2005.

Tim Keller has said that Clowney and J. Alec Motyer were "the fathers of my preaching ministry".

In 1990 a Festschrift was published in his honor. Practical Theology and the Ministry of the Church, 1952-1984: Essays in Honor of Edmund P. Clowney included contributions from Jay E. Adams, William Edgar, Roger Nicole, J. I. Packer, Robert G. Rayburn, and Geoff Thomas.

Clowney married Jean Granger Wright (1920–2008) on August 30, 1942. They had five children.

Publications
Clowney was also a prolific writer. Books that he has authored include:

Preaching and Biblical Theology
Called to the Ministry
Christian Meditation
Doctrine of the Church
The Message of I Peter: The Way of the Cross  (The Bible Speaks Series)
The Unfolding Mystery: Discovering Christ in the Old Testament
Preaching Christ in All of Scripture
The Church (Contours of Christian Theology)
How Jesus Transforms the Ten Commandments

In addition, he authored many articles, lectures and sermons, including the anonymous humor column "Eutychus and His Pin" (later renamed "Eutychus and His Kin") for the magazine Christianity Today from 1955-60, and Bible studies for the daily devotional Tabletalk''.

See also 
 List of Christian theologians

References

External links 
"The Politics of the Kingdom" a biblical-theological essay in which Clowney discusses how the Church must resist the temptation to become subservient to earthly political powers and programs.
Obituary for Dr. Edmund Clowney by Westminster Theological Seminary
EdmundClowney.com, a tribute site

1917 births
2005 deaths
Clergy from Philadelphia
Presbyterians from Pennsylvania
Orthodox Presbyterian Church ministers
Presbyterian Church in America ministers
American Calvinist and Reformed theologians
Presidents of Calvinist and Reformed seminaries
People from Escondido, California
20th-century American non-fiction writers
21st-century American non-fiction writers
20th-century Calvinist and Reformed theologians
21st-century Calvinist and Reformed theologians
20th-century American clergy
Wheaton College (Illinois) alumni
Westminster Theological Seminary alumni
Yale Divinity School alumni
Westminster Seminary California faculty
Westminster Theological Seminary faculty